The Lane Bryant shooting was an incident of mass murder and armed robbery at a Lane Bryant clothing outlet in the Brookside Marketplace in Tinley Park, Illinois, a suburb of Chicago, that occurred on February 2, 2008. The shooting resulted in five deaths and one injury.

The identity of the shooter remains unknown. Police released a sketch of the suspect on February 11, 2008, receiving two dozen leads on the very first day.

Details 
Four customers, a part-time employee and the store manager were taken to the back of the store and shot. Five of them, all women, were killed; the part-time employee was wounded but survived. Police found the victims shortly after receiving an emergency call at 10:45 a.m. The gunman was described as a black man with thick, cornrowed hair and a receding hairline, along with one braid lying over the right side of his face at cheek level and decorated with four light-green beads on the end. Police believe it was a robbery "gone awry".

The five deceased victims were:

 Jennifer L. Bishop, age 34, of South Bend, Indiana;
 Carrie Hudek Chiuso, 33, of Frankfort; 
 Rhoda McFarland, 42, of Joliet (the store manager); 
 Sarah T. Szafranski, 22, of Oak Forest; and
 Connie R. Woolfolk, 37, of Flossmoor.

The police withheld the age and identity of the surviving victim, the part-time employee of the store.

Aftermath

The shopping center was closed and locked down while being searched. It was reopened after police found that the gunman had left the immediate area.

A $100,000 reward, half of which was donated by Lane Bryant's parent company, Charming Shoppes Inc., was offered for information leading to the gunman's arrest. On February 6, 2008, Lane Bryant announced the establishment of The Lane Bryant Tinley Park Memorial Fund in honor of the five women who were killed. Lane Bryant also offered to pay for the victims' funerals.

The Steve Wilkos Show, being taped in Chicago, profiled the suspect of the shooting at the end of one episode since the incident.

The store building itself remained unused until November 2013, when T.J. Maxx took it over for use as a retail outlet.

See also 

 Brown's Chicken massacre, a similar murder of employees on January 8, 1993, in Palatine, Illinois
 List of massacres in Illinois

References

External links
 America's Most Wanted - Unknown Tinley Park Killer
 Sketch of Lane Bryant suspect nets 2 dozen leads

2008 murders in the United States
Mass murder in 2008
2008 mass shootings in the United States
Mass shootings in the United States
Deaths by firearm in Illinois
Murder in Illinois
Unsolved mass murders in the United States
2008 in Illinois
Attacks on shopping malls
Tinley Park, Illinois
Crimes in Illinois
Attacks in the United States in 2008
February 2008 events in the United States
Female murder victims
Mass shootings in Illinois
Attacks on buildings and structures in the United States
February 2008 crimes